Chuckles may refer to:

 Chuck Bueche (AKA Chuckles), a game programmer
 Chuckles, a confectionery produced by Farley's & Sathers Candy Company, Inc.
 Chuckles (G.I. Joe), a fictional character from the G.I. Joe: A Real American Hero toyline
 Chuckles the Clown, a fictional character on The Mary Tyler Moore Show

See also
Laughter (disambiguation)